Millard F. Malin (1891–1974) was an American sculptor most noted for his statues of the Angel Moroni such as the one on the Los Angeles Temple.

Malin was born and raised in Salt Lake City. He was the son of Millard Fillmore Malin and Annie Pinnock Malin. Malin's mother Annie was a Latter-day Saint composer. When he served as a missionary for the Church of Jesus Christ of Latter-day Saints (LDS Church) in New Zealand. After returning from his mission he studies at the University of Utah where he became acquainted with Edward O. Anderson. One of Malin's teachers at the University of Utah was Edwin Evans. Malin's main course of study at this point was medicine, specifically human anatomy.

Malin later went to New York City where he studied under Hermon A. MacNeil at the National Academy of Design. After returning to Salt Lake City Malin established a studio with Edward Anderson. They jointly did the Suguarhouse Pioneer Monument and Malin did statues for several of the LDS temples designed by Anderson. Besides the angel Moroni on the Los Angeles Temple, Malin also designed the oxen that hold up the baptismal font of the Bern Switzerland Temple.  The Utah State capital also has at least two sculptures by Malin in it. They are considered to be in the realist style.

Among those who studied under Malin were Maurice E. Brooks and Alice Morrey Bailey.

Malin was also a founding member of the group Utah Modern Artists. He was also sent by the Federal Art Project of the WPA to document groups of Utes on reservations in eastern Utah. In addition to his work as a sculptor Malin had at least one poem that was published.

References
bio connected with the University of Utah collection of Malin's papers
Springville Art Museum bio of Malin
J. Michael Hunter, "'I Saw Another Angel Fly'", Ensign, January 2000, p. 30
"Another angel", Church News, Sep. 20, 2008
Federal Writers Project. Utah: A Guide to the State. p. 168
Arnold K. Garr, Donald Q. Cannon and Richard O. Cowan, ed., Encyclopedia of Latter-day Saint History. p. 680.

1891 births
Artists from Salt Lake City
Latter Day Saints from Utah
American Mormon missionaries in New Zealand
University of Utah alumni
1974 deaths
Angel Moroni
20th-century Mormon missionaries
20th-century American sculptors
20th-century male artists
American male sculptors
Latter Day Saints from New York (state)
Sculptors from Utah